Calverley is an English toponymic surname associated with the village of Calverley in West Yorkshire, England. Notable people with the surname include:

 Charles Stuart Calverley
 Ernie Calverley
 Walter Calverley (disambiguation)
 William Slater Calverley

References 

. 
English toponymic surnames